Donald Pomery Lay (August 24, 1926 – April 29, 2007) was a United States circuit judge of the United States Court of Appeals for the Eighth Circuit.

Education and career

Born in Princeton, Illinois, Lay received a Bachelor of Arts degree from the University of Iowa in 1949. He received a Juris Doctor from the University of Iowa College of Law in 1951. He was a United States Navy seaman from 1944 to 1945. He was in private practice of law in Omaha, Nebraska from 1951 to 1953. He was in private practice of law in Milwaukee, Wisconsin from 1953 to 1954. He was in private practice of law in Omaha from 1954 to 1966. He was an instructor at the Omaha University School of Law from 1956 to 1957.

Federal judicial service

Lay was nominated by President Lyndon B. Johnson on July 11, 1966, to a seat on the United States Court of Appeals for the Eighth Circuit vacated by Judge Harvey M. Johnsen. He was confirmed by the United States Senate on July 22, 1966, and received his commission the same day. He served as Chief Judge and as a member of the Judicial Conference of the United States from 1979 to 1992. He assumed senior status on January 7, 1992. His service was terminated on April 29, 2007, due to his death.

Other service

Concurrent with his federal judicial service, Lay served as a full-time visiting faculty member at William Mitchell College of Law and as a Professor at the University of Minnesota Law School from 1983 to 2007. Lay died on April 29, 2007 at his home in North Oaks, Minnesota.

Notable cases

One of Lay's most notable rulings was Jenson v. Eveleth Taconite Co., a landmark sexual harassment case that was the subject of the 2005 film North Country. The Supreme Court of the United States agreed with his 1971 dissent on behalf of two Iowa convicts whose parole was revoked without trial in Morrissey v. Brewer and his dissent in Jaycees v. McClure, which compelled the Jaycees to admit women.

Lay dissented in United States v. $124,700 in U.S. Currency, a case that still stands, upholding the civil forfeiture of properties possibly connected to drugs.

References

Sources

External links
 Donald P. Lay profile via University of Iowa
 Donald P. Lay Papers via University of Iowa

1926 births
2007 deaths
People from Princeton, Illinois
Military personnel from Illinois
Judges of the United States Court of Appeals for the Eighth Circuit
United States court of appeals judges appointed by Lyndon B. Johnson
20th-century American judges
University of Iowa alumni
University of Iowa College of Law alumni